Saamaniyan is an upcoming Indian Tamil-language action-thriller film written and directed by R. Rahesh. It stars Ramarajan in the lead role, who made his acting comeback, 10 years after Medhai. It also stars Radha Ravi, M. S. Bhaskar and Mime Gopi in other pivotal roles. It was Ramarajan’s 45th film as an actor.

Cast 
 Ramarajan
 M. S. Bhaskar
 Mime Gopi
 Radha Ravi

Production
The film was tentatively titled as Ramarajan45. Later the title was announced to be Saamaniyan. The film was shot at various locations including Chennai, Bangalore and Tanjore. Ramarajan was reported to be playing the role of a villager in this film, while other actors like M. S. Bhaskar, Radha Ravi and Mime Gopi appear in supporting roles. The first schedule of the film was wrapped up on 7 November 2022.

Music 

Initially, Achu Rajamani was announced as the music composer, however he was replaced by Ilaiyaraaja which marks his reunion with Ramarajan after Annan.

Release
The teaser of the film was released on 19 September 2022. Viyan Aarman, the owner of Art Addict, filed a petition seeking a ban on the release of the film under the name Saamaniyan, saying he registered the title in 2012 and was continually renewing it since; however, the Madras High Court dismissed his plea.

References

Upcoming Tamil-language films

Films scored by Ilaiyaraaja